WIVH (89.9 FM) is a radio station licensed to serve Christiansted, U.S. Virgin Islands. The station is owned and operated by Good News for Life, and airs a Religious format.

The station has been assigned these call letters by the Federal Communications Commission since February 28, 1992.

Translator stations

References

External links
 WIVH official website
 

IVH
Radio stations established in 1993
1993 establishments in the United States Virgin Islands